Botna is an unincorporated community in Shelby County, Iowa, in the United States, located near the West Nishnabotna River.

History
Botna was platted in 1884.  It was originally named Rochdale, after an English town of the same name. The name Botna is a shortened reference to the name of the nearby river.

Botna's population was 37 in 1902, and 75 in 1925.

References

Unincorporated communities in Shelby County, Iowa